This is a list of wars involving the Republic of Costa Rica.

References

 
Costa Rica
Wars